This is a timeline documenting events of Jazz in the year 2017.

Events

January 
 12
 The 16th All Ears festival started in Oslo (January 12–15).
  The 3rd annual Tucson Jazz Festival started in Tucson, Arizona (January 12 – 22).
 20 –  The 36th annual Djangofestival started on Cosmopolite in Oslo, Norway (January 20 – 21).
 21 –  Hot Club de Norvège headline at the annual Djangofestival at Cosmopolite in Oslo, Norway.
 28 –  Nils Petter Molvær is presented as winner of the 2016 Spellemannprisen Jazz award.

February 
 1 – The 6th Bodø Jazz Open started in Bodø, Norway (February 1 – 4).
 2 – The 19th Polarjazz Festival started in Longyearbyen, Svalbard  (February 2–5).
 9 – The 12th Ice Music Festival started in Geilo, Norway (February 9 – 11).

March 
 3 – The 13th Jakarta International Java Jazz Festival started in Jakarta, Indonesia (March 3 – 5).
 31 – The 18th Cape Town International Jazz Festival started in Cape Town, South Africa (March 31 – April 1).

April 
 7 – The 44th Vossajazz started in Voss, Norway (April 7 – 9).
 30 – The International Jazz Day.

May 
 5 – The Balejazz started in Balestrand (May 5 – 7).
 9 – The 28th MaiJazz started in Stavanger, Norway (May 9 – 14).
 10 – The 13th AnJazz, the Hamar Jazz Festival started at Hamar, Norway (May 10 – 14).
 11 – The 17th Festival Jazz à Saint-Germain-des-Prés started in Paris, France (May 11 – 22).
 18 – The 6th Torino Jazz Festival started in Turin (May 18–22).
 26 – The 45th Nattjazz started in Bergen, Norway (May 26 – June 4).

June 
 1 – Proceedings of the Echo Jazz Awards in Hamburg, Germany.
 22 – The 27th JazzBaltica started in Schloss Salzau close to Kiel, Germany (June 22–25).
 23 – The 7th Alfa Jazz Fest started in Lviv, Ukraine (June 23–27).
 28 – The 28th Jazz Fest Wien started in Vienna, Austria (June 28 – July 10).
 29
 The 37th Montreal International Jazz Festival started in Montreal, Quebec, Canada (June 29 - July 8).
 The 37th Jazz à Vienne started in Vienne, France (June 29 - July 13).
 30
 The 5th Love Supreme Festival started in Glynde Place, East Sussex (June 30 – July 2).
 The 51st Montreux Jazz Festival started in Montreux, Switzerland (June 30 – July 15).

July 
 5 – The 53rd Kongsberg Jazzfestival started in Kongsberg, Norway (July 5 – 8).
 6
 The 17th Stavernfestivalen started in Stavern, Norway (July 6 – 8).
 The 21st Skånevik Bluesfestival started in Skånevik, Norway (July 6 – 8).
 7
 The 39th Copenhagen Jazz Festival started in Copenhagen, Denmark (July 7 – 16).
 The 44th Umbria Jazz Festival started in Perugia, Italy (July 7 – 16).
 The 42nd North Sea Jazz Festival started in The Hague, Netherlands ( July 7–9).
 8 – The 52nd Pori Jazz Festival started in Pori, Finland (July 8 – 16).
 11 – The 41st Jazz de Vitoria started in Gasteiz, Spain (July 11 – 15).
 15 – The 29th Aarhus Jazz Festival started in Aarhus, Denmark (July 15 – 22).
 17
 The 70th Nice Jazz Festival started in Nice, France (July 17 – 21).
 The 56th Moldejazz started in Molde, Norway ( July 17 – 22).
 26 – The 22nd Canal Street started in Arendal, Norway (July 26 – 29).
 28 – The 40th Jazz in Marciac started in Marciac, France (July 28 – August 14).

August 
 4 – The 61st Newport Jazz Festival started in Newport, Rhode Island (August 4 – 6).
 8 – The 18th Øyafestivalen started in Oslo, Norway (August 8 – 12).
 10
 The Nišville International Jazz Festival started in Niš, Serbia (August 10–13).
 The 31st Sildajazz started in Haugesund, Norway (August 10 – 14).
11 – The 33rd Brecon Jazz Festival started in Brecon, Wales (August 11 – 13).
 12 – The 32nd Oslo Jazzfestival started in Oslo, Norway ( August 12 – 19).
 31 – The 12th Punktfestivalen started in Kristiansand, Norway ( August 31 - September 2).

September 
 1 – The 16th Tokyo Jazz Festival, started at North Door in Tokyo, Japan (September 1 – 3).
 14 – The 4th Everfest, Sonic Transmissions started at North Door in Austin, Texas (September 14 – 16).
 15 – The 60th Monterey Jazz Festival started in Monterey, California (September 15 – 17).

October 
 6 – The 34th Stockholm Jazz Festival started in Stockholm, Sweden (October 6 – 15).
 19 – The 34th DølaJazz started in Lillehammer, Norway (October 19 – 22).
 25 – The 49th Umeå Jazz Festival started in Umeå, Sweden (October 25 – 29).
 27 – The 38th Cork Jazz Festival started in Cork, Ireland (October 27 – 30).

November 
 2 – The 53rd Jazz Fest Berlin started in Berlin, Germany (November 2 – 5).
 10 – The 25th London Jazz Festival started in London, England (November 10 – 19).
 23 – The São Paulo Jazz Festival started in São Paulo, Brazil (November 23 – 26).

December 
 28 – The 25th Umbria Jazz Winter started in Orvieto, Italy (December 28 – January 1).

Albums released

January

February

March

April

May

June

July

August

September

October

November

December

Deaths

January 
 8
 Buddy Bregman, American arranger, producer, and composer (born 1930).
 Rod Mason, British trumpeter (born 1940).
 10 – Buddy Greco, American singer and pianist (born 1926). 
 14 – John Boudreaux, American drummer (born 1936).
 15
 Terry Cryer, British jazz and blues photographer (born 1934).
 Thandi Klaasen, South African singer (pancreatic cancer) (born 1931).
 16 – Charles "Bobo" Shaw, American drummer (born 1947).
 20 – Chuck Stewart, American photographer (born 1927).
 22 – Jaki Liebezeit, German drummer (died 1939).
 28 – Guitar Gable, American singer, guitarist, and songwriter (born 1937).
 31 – John Wetton, English singer, bassist, and songwriter (cancer) (born 1949).

February 
 5 – David Axelrod, American musician and producer (born 1931).
 7 – Svend Asmussen, Danish violinist, known as "The Fiddling Viking" (born 1916).
 12
 Al Jarreau, American singer (born 1940).
 Barbara Carroll, American pianist and singer (born 1925).
 18 – Clyde Stubblefield, American drummer best known for his work with James Brown (kidney failure) (born 1943).
 19 – Larry Coryell, American guitarist (born 1943).
 20 – Nicolai Munch-Hansen, Danish bassist and composer (born 1977).
 23 – Horace Parlan, American pianist (born 1931).
 24 – Fumio Karashima, Japanese pianist (born 1948).

March 
 3 – Misha Mengelberg, Dutch pianist and composer (born 1935).
 8 – Dave Valentin, American flautist (born 1952).
 13 – Tommy LiPuma, American music producer (born 1936).
 16 – James Cotton, American blues harmonica player, singer and songwriter (born 1935).
 18 – Chuck Berry, American guitarist, singer and songwriter (born 1926).
 20
 Buck Hill, American saxophonist (born 1927).
 Tony Terran, American trumpeter and session musician (born 1926).
 21 – Roy Fisher, British poet and pianist (born  1930).
 24 – Avo Uvezian, Armenian-American pianist, composer, and cigar manufacturer (born 1926).
 26 – Jimmy Dotson, American singer, guitarist, and drummer (born 1933).
 27
 Arthur Blythe, American alto saxophonist and composer (died 1940).
 Clem Curtis, Trinidadian British singer in The Foundations (born 1940).

April 
 1
 Bob Cunningham, American bassist (born 1934).
 Lonnie Brooks, American blues singer and guitarist (born 1933).
 9
 Knut Borge, Norwegian journalist, entertainer, and jazz enthusiast (born 1949).
 Stan Robinson, English tenor saxophonist (born 1936).
 11
 J. Geils, American jazz and blues guitarist in The J. Geils Band (born 1946).
 Toby Smith, British keyboardist and songwriter for Jamiroquai (born 1970).
 15 – Allan Holdsworth, British jazz fusion guitarist in Gong, Soft Machine (born 1946).
 27 – John Shifflett, American bassist (born 1953).
 29 – Ian Cruickshank, English guitarist, educator, author and columnist (born 1947).

May 

 1 – Bruce Hampton, American singer and guitarist, Hampton Grease Band (born 1947).
 3 – Casey Jones, American drummer, singer, and record producer (born 1940).
 7 – Dave Pell, American jazz saxophonist and bandleader (born 1925).
 12 – Bill Dowdy, American drummer in The Three Sounds (born 1932).
 14 – Tom McClung, American pianist and composer (born 1957).
 22 – Mickey Roker, American drummer (born 1932).
 27 – Gregg Allman, American singer, guitarist, pianist, and songwriter,  the Allman Brothers Band (born 1947).
 31 – Bern Nix, American guitarist (born 1947).

June 
 17 – Thara Memory, American trumpeter (born 1948).
 18 – Chris Murrell, American singer (born 1956).
 22 – Jimmy Nalls, American guitarist and singer, Sea Level (born 1951).
 27 – Geri Allen, American pianist (born 1957).
 28 – Phil Cohran, American trumpeter (born 1927).

July 
 4 – John Blackwell American drummer, Prince (born 1973).
 7 – Egil Monn-Iversen, Norwegian composer and pianist (born 1928).
 12 – Ray Phiri, South African jazz fusion singer and guitarist (born 1947).
 13 – Egil Kapstad, Norwegian pianist and composer (born 1940).
 19 – Graham Wood, Australian pianist (born 1971).
 21 – Errol Dyers, South African guitarist (born 1952).
 26 – Tom McIntosh, American trombonist and composer (born 1927).
 30 – Charlie Tagawa, Japanese-American musical entertainer and banjoist (born 1935).
 31 – Chuck Loeb, American guitarist and composer (born 1955).

August 

 4 – Bruno Canfora, Italian composer, conductor, and music arranger (born 1924).
 7 – Janet Seidel, Australian singer and pianist (born 1955).
 16 – Mike Hennessey, English music journalist and pianist (born 1928).
 19 – Bea Wain, American Big Band-era singer (born 1917).
 22 – John Abercrombie, American guitarist, composer and bandleader (born 1944).
 26 – Wilson das Neves, Brazilian bossa nova singer and percussionist (born 1936).
 29 – Larry Elgart, American jazz bandleader (born 1922).
 30 – Skip Prokop, Canadian rock and jazz fusion drummer in Lighthouse, The Paupers (born 1943).
 31 – Janne Carlsson, Swedish drummer and actor (born 1937).

September 
 3 – Walter Becker, American guitarist in Steely Dan, songwriter, and record producer (born 1950).
 5 – Leo Cuypers, Dutch pianist and composer (born 1947).
 11 – Frank Capp, American drummer (born 1931).
 17 – Laudir de Oliveira, Brazilian rock and jazz percussionist in Chicago (born 1940).
 22 – Mike Carr, English organist, pianist and vibraphonist (born 1937).
 27 – CeDell Davis, American guitarist and singer (born 1926).

October 
 6 – Lou Gare, English saxophonist (born 1939).
 8 – Grady Tate, American drummer and singer (born 1932).
 12 – Andy McGhee, American tenor saxophonist and educator (born 1927).
 18 – Phil Miller, English guitarist (born 1949).
 20 – Boris Lindqvist, Swedish singer and musician (born 1940).
 22 – Atle Hammer, Norwegian trumpeter (born 1932).
 24 – Fats Domino, American pianist and singer-songwriter of French Creole descent (born 1928).
 27 – Dick Noel, American singer (born 1927).
 29
 Frank Holder, Guyanese singer and percussionist (born 1925).
 Muhal Richard Abrams, American clarinetist, cellist, and jazz pianist (born 1930).
 30 – Theo Bophela, South African band leader, composer, pianist, arranger, and music educator (born 1931).

November 

 7 – Wendell Eugene, American trombonist (born 1923).
 18 – Ben Riley, American drummer known for playing with Thelonious Monk (born 1933).
 19 – Della Reese, American singer (born 1931).
 23 
 John Coates Jr., American pianist (born 1938).
 Jon Hendricks, American singer (born 1921).
 27 – Robert Popwell, American bass guitarist, The Young Rascals and The Crusaders (born 1950).
 29 – Robert Walker, American guitarist (born 1937).

December 
 2 – Mundell Lowe, American guitarist (born 1922).
 7 – Sunny Murray, American drummer (born 1936).
 13 – Willie Pickens, American pianist (born 1931).
 15 – John Critchinson, English pianist (born 1934).
 16
 Keely Smith, American singer (born 1928).
 Ralph Carney, American saxophonist and clarinetist, Tin Huey (born 1956).
 17 – Kevin Mahogany, American vocalist (born 1958).
 19 – Leo Welch, American guitarist, singer, and songwriter (born 1932).
 21
 Dominic Frontiere, American composer, arranger, and accordionist (born 1931).
 Halvard Kausland, Norwegian guitarist (born 1945).
 Roswell Rudd, American trombonist (born 1935).
 28 – Melton Mustafa, American trumpeter and flugelhornist, Count Basie Orchestra (born 1947).

See also

 List of 2017 albums
 List of jazz festivals
 List of years in jazz
 2010s in jazz
 2017 in music

References

External links 
 History Of Jazz Timeline: 2017 at All About Jazz

2010s in jazz
Jazz